Sarah Danielle Madison (September 6, 1974 – September 27, 2014), sometimes credited as Sarah Danielle Goldberg, was an American actress.

Early life
Madison was born Sarah Goldberg in Springfield, Illinois. She was a 1992 graduate of Latin School of Chicago. She graduated from Amherst College in 1996. When she moved west to pursue a career in acting, she landed a role in Jurassic Park III.

Career
She was well known for her recurring role as Dr. Sarah Glass, the wife of Dr. Matt Camden on The CW's family drama 7th Heaven. She also had a role of Heather Labonte, a fellow medical resident and love interest to Kyle McCarty (played by Kevin Rahm) on Judging Amy. In 2009, she appeared on the medical drama House as the wife of a pain-ridden, suicidal patient in the episode "Painless". She played Colleen Sarkoissian, Liam's mother on The CW's 90210. She played the girlfriend of the teenagers pulled over in their car in Training Day.

Though sometimes credited as Sarah Goldberg, Sarah Danielle Goldberg or Sarah Danielle, the actress preferred to use Sarah Danielle Madison as her professional name because of her fondness for "Madison", the mermaid in the 1984 movie Splash.

Death
On September 27, 2014, Sarah died twenty-one days after her 40th birthday, during a trip to her family's cabin in southeast Wisconsin.

Filmography
Ivans Xtc (2000) – Naomi
Jurassic Park III (2001) – Cheryl Logan, one of Grant's graduate students at the dig site
Training Day (2001) – Female college passenger
Virgins (2001) – Tabitha 
Judging Amy (2002–2004, TV Series) – Dr. Heather Labonte
7th Heaven (2002–2006, TV Series) – Dr. Sarah Glass
House (2009, 1 episode)
Pig (2011) – Woman 2
90210 (2009–2011, TV Series) – Colleen Sarkossian (final appearance)

References

External links

1974 births
2014 deaths
Actresses from Chicago
American television actresses
Amherst College alumni
People from Springfield, Illinois
21st-century American women